Amelita is the second studio album by country band Court Yard Hounds. It was released in July 2013 under Columbia Records.

Track listing

Personnel

Court Yard Hounds
Martie Maguire – fiddle, mandolin, viola, lead vocals, background vocals
Emily Robison – banjo, dobro, acoustic guitar, electric guitar, lead vocals, background vocals

Additional musicians
Bukka Allen – Hammond organ, Wurlitzer
Daniel Clarke – Farfisa organ, Hammond organ, piano
Fred Eltringham – drums, percussion
Audley Freed – 12-string guitar, acoustic guitar, electric guitar
John Ginty – Hammond organ, percussion, piano
Joshua Grange – pedal steel guitar
Billy Harvey – electric guitar
Greg Kurstin – clavinet, drum programming, drums, mellotron, percussion sampling
George Reiff – bass guitar
Martin Strayer – acoustic guitar, electric guitar, piano

References

External links
Amelita by Court Yard Hounds at iTunes.com

2013 albums
Columbia Records albums
Court Yard Hounds albums